Lampa province is a province of the Puno Region in Peru. Its population is about 40,856. The capital is Lampa.

Geography 
The Sillapaka mountain range traverses the province. Some of the highest mountains of the province are listed below:

Political division

Cabanilla
Calapuja
Lampa
Nicasio
Ocuviri
Palca
Paratia
Pucará
Santa Lucía
Vilavila

Ethnic groups 
The people in the province are mainly indigenous citizens of Quechua descent. , Quechua was the first language of 74.56% of the population; Spanish of 24.84%; and Aymara  of 0.37%.

See also 
 Intikancha
 La Raya mountain range
 Pukaqucha
 Pukara
 Pukarani
 Sayt'uqucha
 Suyt'uqucha

References

External links
  

Provinces of the Puno Region